Stefan Rucker (born 20 January 1980 in Knittelfeld) is an Austrian former professional racing cyclist.

Major results

2001 
 2nd Road race, National Under-23 Road Championships
2004
 3rd Raiffeisen Grand Prix
2005
 2nd National Hill Climb Championships
2008
 1st Stage 5 Tour Ivoirien de la Paix
 3rd Road race, National Road Championships
2010
 1st  National Hill Climb Championships
2012
 1st Stage 1 Tour of Szeklerland

References

External links

1980 births
Living people
Austrian male cyclists
People from Knittelfeld
Sportspeople from Styria
21st-century Austrian people